Kim Hae-jin (born April 23, 1997) is a South Korean former figure skater. She is the 2012 JGP Slovenia champion and a three-time (2010, 2011, and 2012) South Korean national champion. She was selected to represent her country at the 2014 Winter Olympics in Sochi. She retired from competition at the conclusion of the 2018 South Korean Figure Skating Championships.

Career

Early career
In the 2007–08 season, Kim placed 5th at the South Korean Championships on the novice level. A year later in 2009, she repeated that placement on the junior level.

2009–10 season: First senior national title 
In the 2009–10 season, Kim competed in 2010 South Korean Championships on the senior level at age twelve. Placing first in both the short program and the free skate, she won the gold medal with 148.78 points. In April 2010, she won the novice title at the 2010 Triglav Trophy, earning 144.11 points. Her score was one of the best among the skaters who competed and the best among all the ladies. Had she competed on the senior level, she would have won the competition.

2010–11 season: Junior Grand Prix debut
Kim was assigned to 2010–11 ISU Junior Grand Prix events in Japan and Germany. However, her foot was injured by another skater's skate blade in training, resulting in her withdrawal from the Japan event. She made her junior international debut at the event in Germany, finishing 28th. At the 2011 South Korean Championships, she placed third in the short program scoring 46.82 points, and won the free skate with 98.47 to win her second national title.

2011–12 season 
The following season, Kim was assigned to the 2011–12 ISU Junior Grand Prix events in Brisbane, Australia, and in Brasov, Romania. She won the short program in Brisbane with 52.26, but fell four times in the free skate, earning 78.76, to finish 5th with 131.02. In Brasov, Kim was placed sixth with 44.78 after one of her spins were considered invalid, but rebounded to third with 99.83, earning the bronze medal with a total score of 144.61.  Kim then participated in the 2012 World Junior Championships and earned 51.56 in the short program and 98.15 in the free skate, finishing 8th overall with the total score of 149.71.

2012–13 to 2013–14 
In the 2012–13 season, Kim was assigned to 2012-13 ISU Junior Grand Prix events in Slovenia and Austria. In her first event in Austria, Kim placed third in the short program, with her triple toe-loop - triple toe-loop combination, receiving her new personal best of 54.46. However, she dropped to fifth after the free skate, where she had some trouble with her jumps. However, two weeks later, in Slovenia, she rebounded to first in the short program, and strong consistency of jumps and high levels of other elements with strong choreography helped her defend her placement in the free skate. With the total of 147.30, she became the first South Korean woman to stand on the top of the podium since Kim Yuna, the 2010 Olympic Champion, won two golds in the 2005–06 ISU Junior Grand Prix. This made her first alternate to the ISU Junior Grand Prix Final.

In the 2013–14 season, Kim was assigned to 2013-14 ISU Junior Grand Prix events in Slovakia and Czech Republic. Earning 10th and 8th.

2013–14 season: Senior ISU Championship debut
At the 2014 South Korean Championships, Kim placed second in the short and fifth in the free; she won the bronze medal behind Park So-youn and Kim Yuna.

Kim made her senior international debut at the 2014 Four Continents Championships, where she finished sixth. In the process she set new personal bests in the short program, free skating and her combined score.

She was selected to represent her country at the 2014 Winter Olympics with her national teammates, Kim Yuna and Park So-youn. She was 18th after the short program and placed 16th overall. In March, she placed 23rd at the 2014 World Championships.

2014–15 season: Grand Prix debut
She began her season with 5th at the 2014 Asian Open and then 9th at the 2014 Ondrej Nepela Trophy.

For the 2015-16 Grand Prix series, Kim made her senior Grand Prix debut at the 2014 Skate Canada International, where she placed 9th, and came in 8th at the 2014 Cup of China.

At the 2015 South Korean Championships, she placed 12th in the short and 5th in the free, finishing 5th overall.

Kim placed 11th at the 2015 Four Continents Championships.  Afterwards, at the 2015 Worlds Championships, she placed 19th.

Skating techniques
She landed five types of triple jumps (every one except the triple Axel) in the national competition. She landed a triple toe loop-triple toe loop combination in a national competition and a triple flip-triple loop combination in an international event.

Public life and endorsements
She joined 2010 Olympic ladies champion and fellow South Korean skater Kim Yuna in an ice show, All That Skate, which was held on July 23–25, 2010 in Goyang, South Korea, alongside other skaters like Michelle Kwan, Sasha Cohen and Stéphane Lambiel.

Programs

Competitive highlights

GP: Grand Prix; CS: Challenger Series; JGP: Junior Grand Prix

Detailed results

 QR = Qualifying round
 Personal bests highlighted in bold.

References

 2011 Asian Figure Skating Trophy Results
 2011 New Zealand Winter Games Results
 2008 Asian Figure Skating Trophy Results

External links
 

South Korean female single skaters
1997 births
Living people
Figure skaters at the 2014 Winter Olympics
Olympic figure skaters of South Korea
People from Anyang, Gyeonggi
Sportspeople from Gyeonggi Province